Castle Songs is a short EP by Ohio-based pop punk band Mixtapes. It is their shortest release so far.

Track listing

Personnel
Ryan Rockwell – vocals, guitar
Maura Weaver – vocals, guitar
Michael Remley – bass
Boone Haley – drums

References

2011 EPs